Hamilton Glacier is a glacier about  long draining northwest from Edward VII Peninsula south of Cape Colbeck, Antarctica. It was named by the Advisory Committee on Antarctic Names after Gordon S. Hamilton of the faculty, University of Maine, who was a theoretical and field researcher of ice motion in the West Antarctic ice stream area from the 1980s.

See also
 List of glaciers in the Antarctic
 Glaciology

References

Glaciers of King Edward VII Land